Bai Malleh Mustapha Wadda or BMW  is a former Gambian multi-athlete currently coaching GFA League First Division side Real de Banjul FC.

Wadda  formerly coached Kenyan Premier League side Nairobi City Stars from late 2012 to mid-2013 as a replacement for Gideon Ochieng. 

He was re-appointed Real de Banjul FC in April 2021 to replace Ebou Jarra.

References

External links
 Bai Malleh Wadda at NFT
 Bai Malleh Wadda at The Point

1959 births 
Living people
Football managers in Kenya
Gambian football managers